Nebria arinae is a species of ground beetle in the Nebriinae family that is endemic to Altai region of Russia.

References

arinae
Beetles described in 2001
Endemic fauna of Altai